Mira Kuisma (born 6 May 1987) is a Finnish retired ice hockey goaltender and current head coach of the Finnish women's national under-18 ice hockey team and Team Kuortane of the Naisten Liiga. During her playing career, she was a member of the Finnish national team and won bronze medals at the 2010 Winter Olympics and 2009 IIHF Women's World Championship.

See also
 List of Olympic women's ice hockey players for Finland

References

External links

1987 births
Living people
People from Kuopio
Finnish women's ice hockey goaltenders
Finnish ice hockey coaches
Naisten Liiga (ice hockey) coaches
KalPa Naiset players
Oulun Kärpät Naiset players
Ice hockey players at the 2010 Winter Olympics
Medalists at the 2010 Winter Olympics
Olympic bronze medalists for Finland
Olympic ice hockey players of Finland
Olympic medalists in ice hockey
Sportspeople from North Savo